Miljevići is a Serbian toponym that may refer to:

 Miljevići, Istočno Novo Sarajevo, a town in Republika Srpska, Bosnia and Herzegovina
 Miljevići, Gradiška, a town in Bosnia and Herzegovina
 Miljevići, Prijepolje, a town in Serbia
 Miljevići, Zavidovići, a town in Zavidovići, Bosnia and Herzegovina

See also
 Miljević, a village in the municipality of Golubac, Serbia